Nima Kiann (born January 26, 1970) is an Iranian-born Swedish ballet artist, choreographer, visual artist and dance scholar.

He recreated the disbanded Iranian National Ballet Company in Sweden and through his dance company, Les Ballets Persans, established close contacts with national ballet companies in Central Asia resulting in revival of forgotten ballets, introducing contemporary dance in some parts of the Caucasus and Central Asia and organizing the first international tours for these companies since the breakdown of the Soviet Union. Kiann is a recipient of several international awards.

Early life and education

Nima Kiann was born in Tehran, Iran and acquired a multi-disciplinary training in painting, calligraphy and graphics at Tehran Fine Arts School. At the age of seventeen and during the ongoing Iran–Iraq War, he left his native country moving first to Turkey and later to Sweden. He entered the Gothenburg Ballet Academy in Sweden in 2001 and started his elementary ballet training at the age of twenty-one as the only male among many younger female dance students. Lia Schubert, the founder director of the academy, took him under her wing and scheduled a special classical training program for Kiann. His advancement in classical ballet resulted in dancing principal roles at Theatre Talia. Kiann received his first professional dance contract in 1994 at the Göteborg Opera (Gothenburg Opera Ballet), a year before completing his dance education at the Academy. After his graduation, he continued his dance education at École supérieure de danse de Cannes Rosella Hightower in France and later took part in various master classes throughout Europe. His training in classical ballet was under Lia Schubert, Susanne Lindström, Anthony Ferro, Rosella Hightower, Marc du Bouaÿs, James Urban, Hassen Bahiri and László Mézsáros.

Recreation of the Iranian National Ballet Company

After a freelancing dancer career in Europe, Kiann introduced his project of reviving the Iranian National Ballet Company in 1998. The project, taking five years to be realized, resulted in the establishment of the Foundation of Les Ballets Persans in Sweden (2001). The dance company had its World Premiere in 2002 and was regarded as the most extensive Iranian artistic project ever realized in exile. L’Academie de Ballets Persans, the Forum of Persian and Middle Eastern Dance and the European Youth Dance Project, which received an international impact, are educational and scholar projects that Kiann realized within Les Ballets Persans.

Collaboration with national ballet companies in Central Asia

The World Premiere of Les Ballets Persans included two full-length ballets (Babek and Seven Beauties - 2002) of prominent Azerbaijani choreographers Rafiga Akhundova and Maksud Mamedov. These pieces were created during the Soviet Era and had been fallen into oblivion since their excerption from the repertoire of the National Ballet of Azerbaijan in 1970's and 1980's.
In 2012, Kiann was appointed as the Principal Guest Choreographer of National Ballet of Tajikistan introducing his repertoire and the contemporary dance to the company and paving the way for the recently reestablished Tajik ballet for development, new performing experience and cultural exchange. The General Director of the State Academic Opera and Ballet Theatre of Tajikistan, Golahmad Majidov, said in a TV reportage "We praise Maestro Kiann for his endeavors to introduce new and avant-garde choreographies to the dance community of Tajikistan and for organizing the first international tour for our National Ballet after the breakdown of the Soviet Union".
Kiann organized in 2014 the first international presentation of dancers of the National Ballet of Kyrgyzstan in the West after the fall of the Soviet Union as a result of a collaboration between the Kyrgyz Ministry of Culture and Les Ballets Persans.

Academic activities

Beside his artistic practice, Kiann's cultural engagement includes directorship of several cultural associations and managing Parnian Radio in Sweden as its founder and feature editor. Kiann is the author of several multilingual scholar papers about dancing in Iran, Middle East and Central Asia and had had academic contributions to art universities in Austria, England, France, Germany, Iran, Tajikistan and the United States. The Fate of Dance in Iranian Diaspora (1999), Persian Dance and Its Forgotten History (2000), Farhang-e nām va vāzheh-gizini barāye radeh-hā-ye bāleh dar zabān-e fārsi [Terminology and Equivalent Terms for Ballet Titles in Persian Language] (2004), History of Ballet in Azerbaijan (2005) are among his scholar productions. He has served as artistic advisor for ministries of culture, cultural organizations and festivals throughout the world, among them State Academic Opera and Ballet Theatre of Tajikistan, Arts and Culture Festival of Tirgan in Canada, Culture Ministry of Kyrgyzstan, etc.

Celebration of Nima Kiann

On March 9, 2008, Toos Foundation organized a gala performance in London, at Logan Hall-University of London, to celebrate Nima Kiann on his artistic endeavors and achievements resulting in promotion and realization of Iran's most extensive artistic project ever carried out outside of Iran. The gala performance included a seminar on 3000 years of Persian dance history based on one of Kiann's vastly regarded articles:

"The founding of les ballets persans in the year 2002 was the fruit from several years of endeavor by a young man, who is in love with his motherland as well as with its culture and history of art. Thanks to this love, he has combined what he has learnt about the art of ballet with some surviving remnants from the culture of his birthplace in order to create a colourful rainbow which represents the diverse manifestations of art in the land which nurtured him. Despite the fact that he spent only the first seventeen years of his thirty-eight-year life in his homeland, his love for the motherland and constant acquaintance with its eternal culture nevertheless directed him along the difficult path of reviving and safeguarding on the most beautiful legacies of iran's art heritage. By founding the dance company of les ballets persans, Nima Kiann has in fact created a full-length mirror to reflect iran's culture, history and art in a perspective depicting an art form, which is either not known among our compatriots or is synonymous with decadence. As he himself, has said: he has had the good fortune of finding a jewel, which had fallen beneath the dust of spitefulness; and there was a need to bring back the luster to this jewel by adopting a fresh approach and by drawing a new plan. tonight, we have witnessed participating members of his newly launched european youth dance project to perform ballets from Les Ballets Persans' repertoire."
- Quotes from the Announcement Ceremony

Kiann was offered the Ferdowsi Award "For his untiring efforts to give life to a forgotten Iranian cultural and artistic heritage, and for recreating and reestablishing the Iranian National Ballet through his dance company of Les Ballets Persans".
"As Founder, Artistic Director and Principal Choreographer of Les Ballets Persans, Nima Kiann continues to create an international cultural impact, leading the most extensive Iranian artistic project ever realized outside of Iran by bringing together the talents and creative resources of distinguished artists from all around the world, with the common goal of working for the revival and enrichment of a great cultural and artistic asset. Toos Foundation salutes Nima Kiann's strong artistic vision and organizing abilities which combined have made him one of the most successful cultural administrators of Iranian community in Europe."

Choreographies

Moving Through Secrecy (1997)
Music: Iranian Orchestra for New Music

Femme (2002) - variation
Music: Hossein Alizadeh
Costumes: Nima Kiann

Separation (2002)
Music: Music: Majid Derakhshani
Vocal: Zohreh Jooya
Costumes: Doriz

Simay-Jan (2002) - variation
Music: Majid Derakhshani
Vocal: Zohreh Jooya
Costumes: Nima Kiann

Devine Banquet (2002)
Music: Shamss Ensemble
Vocal: Shahram Nazeri
Costumes: Nima Kiann

Femme (2003) - full-length ballet
Music: Hossein Alizadeh
Costumes: Nima Kiann

Les étoiles (2003)
Music: Majid Derakhshani
Vocal: Zohreh Jooya
Costumes: Tahir Tairov

Papou-Soleymani (2004)
Music: Majid Derakhshani
Vocal: Zohreh Jooya
Costumes: Jamal

Bon Voyage (2004)
Music: Majid Derakhshani
Vocal: Zohreh Jooya
Costumes: Nima Kiann

Kaveh the Blacksmith (2004)
Music: Ahmad Pejman and Mohammad Shams
Vocal: Mario Taghadossi
Costumes: Jamal and Nima Kiann

Scheherazade (2004) - after Fokine
Music: Nikolay Rimsky-Korsakov
Orchestra: Persian International Philharmonic
Conductor: Alexander Rahbari
Costumes: Jamal

Simay-jan the Gilani Girl (2007) - full-length ballet
Music: Majid Derakhshani
Vocal: Zohreh Jooya
Costumes: Nima Kiann

Rumi Rumi (2008)
Music: Shamss Ensemble
Composer: Kaykhosro Pournazeri
Costumes: Nima Kiann

Turquoise Land - Dream of Peace (2008)
Music: Aref Ensemble
Composer: Parviz Meshkatian
Costumes & Tiara Design: Nima Kiann

Hanging Gardens of Lost Dreams (2008)
Music: Alexander Rahbari
Orchestra: Persian International Philharmonic
Conductor: Alexander Rahbari
Costumes: Nima Kiann

Vis and Ramin (2011)
Libretto: Maria Sabaye Moghaddam
Music: Peyman Soltani
Orchestra: Slovak National Symphony Orchestra
Conductor: Alexander Rahbari
Costumes & Tiara Design: Nima Kiann

Symphony of Elegy (2012) - after Fokine
Music: Alexander Rahbari
Orchestra: Persian International Philharmonic
Conductor: Alexander Rahbari
Costumes: Nima Kiann

Engagements

Artistic Director
Les Ballets Persans
International Peace Culture Festival
International Ballet Master Classes Seminar

Artistic Advisor
Ministry of Culture of Kyrgyzstan
State Academic Opera and Ballet Theatre of Tajikistan
Arts and Culture Festival of Tirgan - Canada
Dance Connection - Sweden
Global Campaign for Free Expression - England

Producer
Kiann Artist and Production Management
Forum of Persian and Middle Eastern Dance
Academie de Danse de Ballets Persans
European Youth Dance Project
International Young Artists’ Camp
manoto1 TV (Marjan Television Network)

Principal Choreographer
 National Ballet of Kyrgyzstan
 Bishkek International Dance Festival - Kyrgyzstan
 National Ballet of Tajikistan
 Les Ballets Persans
 Nowoczesne Dance Company

See also
 Iranian National Ballet Company
 Persian Dance
 Roudaki Hall Opera

References 

 Bibliography
 Craine, Debra & Mackrell, Judith (2000). Oxford Dictionary of Dance. New York: Oxford University Press
 Koegler, Horst (1987). The Concise Oxford Dictionary of Ballet. New York: Oxford University Press
 Oxford Reference
 Tirgan Festival - Nima Kiann Dance Advisor
 Nima Kiann; Founder of the New Iranian National Ballet in Europe. Shahrvand newspaper, Canada. 2009-10-13. Article in Persian language.
 Dance Guide - European Directory of Dance
 Official biography of Nima Kiann
 Marquis Who's Who

External links

Les Ballets Persans
Eastern Dance Forum
The Global Language of Dance - An Interview with Iranian Ballet Artist Nima Kiann (Retrieved 2013-03-23)

1970 births
Living people
Iranian male dancers
Iranian male stage actors
Swedish male stage actors
Swedish male ballet dancers
Swedish choreographers
People from Tehran
Iranian emigrants to France
Iranian emigrants to Sweden
20th-century ballet dancers
21st-century ballet dancers